The Lost Stradivarius (1895), by J. Meade Falkner, is a short novel of ghosts and the evil that can be invested in an object, in this case an extremely fine Stradivarius violin. It has been described as "one of Falkner's three celebrated novels" and as a "psychic romance".

Previous owner's ghost
After finding the violin of the title in a hidden compartment in his college rooms, the protagonist, a wealthy young heir, becomes increasingly secretive as well as obsessed by a particular piece of music, which seems to have the power to call up the ghost of the violin's previous owner. Roaming from England to Italy, the story involves family love, lordly depravity, and the tragedy of obsession, all conveyed in a "high" serious tone not uncommon in late Victorian literature. Preceding  ghost stories by several years, it has been called the novel James might have written, had he written novels.

Broadcast
This story was adapted as the first episode of the ATV produced ITV horror anthology series Mystery and Imagination, broadcast on 29 January 1966. All known copies of the episode were wiped or destroyed, and only a complete low-quality audio recording is known to exist.

In August 2008, a Joanna David reading of the novel was broadcast on BBC Radio 7.

References

External links

1895 British novels
English fantasy novels
William Blackwood books